The Port of Bellingham is a government agency in Bellingham, Whatcom County, Washington, United States which operates two large marinas, port facilities and the Bellingham International Airport, along with other ports in towns such as Blaine.

External links
 Official website

Whatcom County, Washington
Economy of Bellingham, Washington